Linda Sara is a 1994 Puerto Rican film directed by Jacobo Morales and starring former Miss Universe Dayanara Torres and singer Chayanne. The film was selected as the Puerto Rican entry for the Best Foreign Language Film at the 67th Academy Awards, but was not accepted as a nominee.

Cast
 Dayanara Torres - Young Sara
 Chayanne - Young Alejandro
 Daniel Lugo - Gustavo
 Johanna Rosaly - Sofía
 Jacobo Morales - Pablo
 Jorge Luis Ramos - Mario
 Joan Amick - Doña Sara
 Adamari López - Tita
 Benjamín Morales - Don Alejandro
 Jorge Javier Melani - Tavito

See also
 Cinema of Puerto Rico
 List of Puerto Ricans in the Academy Awards
 List of submissions to the 67th Academy Awards for Best Foreign Language Film
 List of Puerto Rican submissions for the Academy Award for Best Foreign Language Film

References

External links
Linda Sara at the Internet Movie Database

1994 films
Puerto Rican films
1990s Spanish-language films
Films directed by Jacobo Morales
1994 romantic comedy films